Chaimae Eddinari is a Moroccan judoka. She is a gold medalist at the 2019 African Games and a bronze medalist at the 2021 African Judo Championships.

In 2018, she competed in the women's 48 kg event at the World Judo Championships held in Baku, Azerbaijan.

She competed in the women's 48 kg event at the 2022 Mediterranean Games held in Oran, Algeria.

Achievements

References

External links 
 

Living people
Year of birth missing (living people)
Place of birth missing (living people)
Moroccan female judoka
African Games medalists in judo
African Games gold medalists for Morocco
Competitors at the 2019 African Games
Competitors at the 2022 Mediterranean Games
Mediterranean Games competitors for Morocco
21st-century Moroccan women